Bədəlan (also, Bedalan and Bedelan) is a village and municipality in the Masally Rayon of Azerbaijan.  It has a population of 2,250.

Demographics
 Idris Khalilov (Azerbaijani: İdris Xəlilov) is an Azerbaijani cardiologist.

References 

Populated places in Masally District